Formula Renault 2.0 Brazil was a Formula Renault 2.0 racing series based in Brazil. It ran from 2002 to 2006, and was operated by former Formula One driver Pedro Diniz. Several drivers who have raced in Formula One also previously raced in this series, including Nelson Piquet Jr., Lucas di Grassi and Robert Kubica.

Champions

See also
Formula Renault

References

Formula Renault 2.0 series
Auto racing series in Brazil
Recurring sporting events established in 2002
Recurring sporting events disestablished in 2006
Defunct auto racing series
Defunct sports competitions in Brazil
Motorsport competitions in Brazil